The Rockaway Times is a community newspaper established in the neighborhood of Rockaway Park, NY. They have been in operation since June 2014. The Rockaway Times is a weekly newspaper, coming out each Thursday. It is currently overseen by Publishers Sean McVeigh and Jeanne Ferriola and Managing Editor Katie McFadden. Former publisher and founder Kevin Boyle retired at the end of December 2022. The paper features articles covering events, news, features and more about the Rockaway community.

References

External links 
 THE ROCKAWAY TIMES - First and Free

2014 establishments in New York City
Newspapers published in New York (state)